Zoller-Frasier Round Barn is a historic round barn located at Newville in Herkimer County, New York.  It was built about 1895 and is approximately 80 feet in diameter.  It is constructed of clapboard sided stud walls above a low mortared stone foundation.  It is built surrounding a self-supporting central silo.

It was listed on the National Register of Historic Places in 1984.

References

Barns on the National Register of Historic Places in New York (state)
Infrastructure completed in 1895
Round barns in New York (state)
Buildings and structures in Herkimer County, New York
National Register of Historic Places in Herkimer County, New York